Law Islands is a group of small islands lying off the east end of Law Promontory, at the west side of the entrance to Stefansson Bay. They were mapped by Norwegian cartographers from aerial photos taken by the Lars Christensen Expedition (1936–37), and first visited by an ANARE party led by P.W. Crohn in 1956. They were so named by Antarctic Names Committee of Australia (ANCA) because of their proximity to Law Promontory.

See also
List of antarctic and sub-antarctic islands

References

Islands of Enderby Land
Archipelagoes of the Southern Ocean